Carlo Mornati (born 16 March 1972 in Lecco) is an Italian rower.

References 

 
 

1972 births
Living people
Italian male rowers
Sportspeople from Lecco
Rowers at the 1996 Summer Olympics
Rowers at the 2000 Summer Olympics
Rowers at the 2004 Summer Olympics
Rowers at the 2008 Summer Olympics
Olympic silver medalists for Italy
Olympic rowers of Italy
Olympic medalists in rowing
World Rowing Championships medalists for Italy
Medalists at the 2000 Summer Olympics